Girl Rush is a 1944 American comedy film directed by Gordon Douglas and written by Robert E. Kent. The film stars Wally Brown, Alan Carney, Frances Langford, Barbara Jo Allen, Robert Mitchum, Paul Hurst, Patti Brill and Sarah Padden. The film was released on October 25, 1944, by RKO Pictures.

Plot
During the gold rush of 1849, two vaudevillians, Jerry Miles and Mike Strager, travel to find gold in a town called Red Creek which lacks women. The men of Red Creek promise them gold in return for their bringing women to the town. As Jerry and Mike's vaudeville troupe, which includes women, nears Red Creek, they learn the town may not be welcoming. The men in the troupe dress like women to test the town's attitude. Upon discovering the ruse, a fight breaks out; however, the vaudevillians are finally accepted and perform. During the performance, news comes that a huge gold deposit has been located near town, and everyone rushes out, leaving Jerry and Mike alone on stage.

Cast 
 Wally Brown as Jerry Miles
 Alan Carney as Mike Strager
 Frances Langford as Flo Daniels
 Barbara Jo Allen as Suzie Banks (billed as Vera Vague)
 Robert Mitchum as Jimmy Smith
 Paul Hurst as Muley
 Patti Brill as Claire
 Sarah Padden as Mrs. Emma Mason
 Cy Kendall as 'Honest' Greg Barlan
 John Merton as Scully

See also
 List of American films of 1944

References

External links 
 
 
 
 

1944 films
American black-and-white films
RKO Pictures films
Films directed by Gordon Douglas
1944 comedy films
American comedy films
Films scored by Leigh Harline
1940s English-language films
1940s American films